Adrian Alvarado may refer to:

 Adrian Alvarado (actor) (born 1976), American actor
 Adrian Alvarado (figure skater) (born 1983), Mexican figure skater